Parks Glacier is a glacier draining southeastward from Weiss Amphitheater, a caldera in southern Mount Sidley, in the Executive Committee Range, Marie Byrd Land. Mapped by United States Geological Survey (USGS) on the Executive Committee Range Traverse of 1959. Named by Advisory Committee on Antarctic Names (US-ACAN) for Perry E. Parks, Jr., exploration geophysicist and assistant seismologist on the Marie Byrd Land Traverse, 1959–60.

References

Glaciers of Marie Byrd Land
Executive Committee Range